Croomia is a genus of primitive angiosperm herbs in the Stemonaceae family, first described as a genus in 1840.

Taxonomy 
Once included in its own family, Croomiaceae, Croomia has also previously been included in Dioscoreaceae.

Subdivision 
About six species.
 Croomia heterosepala (Baker) Okuyama - Japan
 Croomia hyugaensis Kadota & Mas.Saito - Kyushu
 Croomia japonica Miq. - Anhui, Fujian, Jiangxi, Zhejiang, Chugoku, Kyushu
 Croomia kinoshitae Kadota - Shikoku
 Croomia pauciflora (Nutt.) Torr. - United States (FL GA AL LA)
 Croomia saitoana Kadota - Kyushu

Distribution and habitat 
Croomia is native to China, Japan, and the southeastern United States. The plants grow in moist, shady woods. Their small flowers are borne beneath the leaves.

References

Bibliography

External links

 C. pauciflora at the Atlas of Florida Vascular Plants
 C. pauciflora at the USDA Plants Database
 Image of C. pauciflora  at Torreya State Park

Pandanales genera
Stemonaceae